Andrew Rushton is a male international table tennis player from England.

Table tennis career
He represented England in the 2006 World Table Tennis Championships in the Swaythling Cup (men's team event) with Darius Knight, Paul Drinkhall and Andrew Baggaley.

He won three Under 21 national titles English National Table Tennis Championships in 2001 and 2003 and 2004.

See also
 List of England players at the World Team Table Tennis Championships

References

English male table tennis players
1983 births
Living people
Commonwealth Games medallists in table tennis
Commonwealth Games silver medallists for England
Table tennis players at the 2006 Commonwealth Games
Medallists at the 2006 Commonwealth Games